Three Peaks is a 2017 German-Italian drama film directed by Jan Zabeil. It was screened in the Special Presentations section at the 2017 Toronto International Film Festival.

Cast
 Bérénice Bejo
 Alexander Fehling
 Arian Montgomery

References

External links
 

2017 films
2017 drama films
German drama films
Italian drama films
2010s German-language films
2010s French-language films
2017 multilingual films
German multilingual films
Italian multilingual films
2010s Italian films
2010s German films